"Morir Solo" (English: "To Die Alone") is a song by Dominican-American singer Prince Royce. The song was released on August 30, 2019  as the fourth single for Royce's sixth studio album, Alter Ego (2020). The music video premiered on the same day.

Charts

Weekly charts

Year-end charts

Certifications

See also
List of Billboard Tropical Airplay number ones of 2019

References

2019 singles
2019 songs
Prince Royce songs
Sony Music Latin singles
Songs written by Prince Royce
Spanish-language songs